Quebradnotia is a genus of moths of the family Tortricidae.

Species
Quebradnotia carchigena Razowski & Wojtusiak, 2008
Quebradnotia chasigrapha Razowski & Wojtusiak, 2006
Quebradnotia nolckeniana (Zeller, 1877)
Quebradnotia ouralia Razowski & Wojtusiak, 2006
Quebradnotia quebradae Razowski & Wojtusiak, 2006

See also
List of Tortricidae genera

References

External links
tortricidae.com

Eucosmini
Tortricidae genera
Taxa named by Józef Razowski